Dr Ranjay Vardhan (3 May 1969) is an Indian Sociologist who is serving as Head, Department of Sociology at the Post Graduate Government College for Girls, Sector 42, Chandigarh. He has developed the concept of Covidalization, i.e., Covid Socialization. He has published works in the field of Family and Gender Studies and has done pioneering works in the field of broken hearts.<ref>{{cite news|url=https://www.bbc.co.uk/hindi/india/2012/02/120214_broken_heart_ac.shtml|title=BBC Hindi – भारत – वेलेंटाइन्स: दिल टूटने पर टूटे दिलों के डॉक्टर की राय...|date=14 February 2012|publisher=BBC|accessdate=14 February 2012|quote='द ब्रोकन हार्ट्स सोसाइटी' के संस्थापक डॉक्टर वर्धन ने बीबीसी से बातचीत में उन्होंने कहा, बहुत सारे लोग इस दिन को 'प्रोपोजल डे' यानि प्रस्ताव रखने के दिन की तरह लेते हैं. इससे ज्यादा नुक्सान होता है. प्रस्ताव कई बार अस्वीकार हो जाते हैं और दिल टूट जाते हैं.'|language=Hindi}}</ref>

Biography
Dr.Ranjay Vardhan studied at Chandigarh. He did his schooling From D.A.V.Senior Secondary School, Sector 8, Chandigarh and graduation from Post Graduate Govt.College, Sector 11, Chandigarh. He received his Post Graduation and Doctoral Degree in Sociology from Panjab University, Chandigarh. He was awarded University Grants Commission Senior Fellowship in July 1991 He has also completed Certificate/Diploma courses in French, German and Persian from Panjab University, Chandigarh between 1993 and 1995.

Academic career

He has authored Eleven Books, besides 20 articles in research journals and books. Chandigarh Sahitya Akademi included his works in the 'Directory of Writers'. He has been given epithets like Newton of Heartbreak, Doctor Feelgood, Doctor Rehabilitation, Dr Fixit, Mr Fixit and Dr Glue'' by media for his work. He has presented papers at International Conferences in Europe and Asia and has been invited to present a paper at Harvard University, USA in May 2012. He has been invited to deliver lectures and papers within India and abroad. He has presented papers at International Conference on Women in Seoul, Korea and Stockholm University, Stockholm. He has delivered extension lectures at Punjab Police Academy, Phillaur, National Institute of Nursing, P.G.I. M.E.R., Chandigarh, Department of Mass Communication, University School of Open Learning, Panjab University, Chandigarh and also at other places. He has often been quoted in newspapers and magazines as a Sociologist. His two books are included in References in Syllabus of Sociology of Panjab University, Chandigarh. His paper entitled "Elder Abuse and Elder Victimization" has been published in International Annals of Criminology, volume 55, Issue 1 May 2017, pp. 99–113 published by Cambridge University Press. His paper Crime and Abuse Against Elderly Women in India: Laws, Policies, and Need for Intervention has published in Handbook of Aging, Health and Public Policy, 2022 by Springer. His book "Covidalization: A New Concept in Social Science" has published in 2023.

Bibliography
 Female Headed Households in Patriarchal Society: A Sociological Study", 1999, 
 Coping with Broken Hearts- World's First Complete Self-Help Book for Broken Hearts, 2007, 
 Single Women: A Study of Spinsters, 2008, Indian Publishers Distributors, Delhi, India, 
 European Union Manifesto and other Essays- A model to overcome recession and making a new world order, 2009, Indian Publishers Distributors, Delhi, India
 Ranjikayen- A collection of Poems, 2002, 
 Co-author of Book "Changing Face of Education: A New Perspective", Indian Publishers Distributors, Delhi, India, 
 Information Communication Technology and Gender, 2012, Indian Publishers Distributors, Delhi, India,   
 Co-Editor "Indian Women: Issues and Perspectives", 2012, Indian Publishers Distributors, Delhi, India, 
 Essentials of Sociology", 2017, New Academic Publishing Co., Jalandhar, 
 Rural Sociology, 2021, New Academic Publishing Co., Jalandhar, ISBN 81-87476-64-8
 Covidalization: Covid Socialization A New Concept in Social Science, 2023, Mohindra Publishing House, Chandigarh ISBN 978-93-90758-53-1

References

12. Vardhan, R. (2022). Crime and Abuse Against Elderly Women in India: Laws, Policies, and Need for Intervention. In: Handbook of Aging, Health and Public Policy. Springer, Singapore. https://doi.org/10.1007/978-981-16-1914-4_67-1

External links
Post Graduate Government College for Girls, Sector 42, Chandigarh official web site

External links
 http://ijcrt.org/papers/IJCRT2006194.pdf
 https://www.cambridge.org/core/journals/international-annals-of-criminology/article/elder-abuse-and-elder-victimization-a-sociological-analysis/32B257E7BB1B0FD70B23499C0A1C93AE/core-reader
 https://link.springer.com/referenceworkentry/10.1007/978-981-16-1914-4_67-1

Scholars from Chandigarh
Indian sociologists
1969 births
Living people
Panjab University alumni